Zikim is a kibbutz in southern Israel. Located in the northern Negev desert, it falls under the jurisdiction of Hof Ashkelon Regional Council.

History
The kibbutz was established in 1949 on land that had belonged to the depopulated Palestinian village of Hiribya, by a group of young Romanian Jews who belonged to Hashomer Hatzair before their arrival in Mandatory Palestine in 1947.

At that time, Jewish settlement in the Negev was very sparse, and each new location was considered to be a "point of light" (zik) in the wilderness. Michael Har-Segor, later an Israeli historian, came up with the name while imprisoned in Romania for his activity in Hashomer Hatzair. He says he translated a quote from Pushkin into Hebrew: "From sparks shall come a flame."

Zikim attracted members of Hashomer Hatzair from around the world, most recently from South America. British actor Bob Hoskins, although not Jewish, worked as a volunteer in Zikim in 1967.

In 2006 a Qassam rocket fired from northern Gaza hit a mattress factory in Zikim. Islamic Jihad claimed responsibility for the rocket attack. In July 2014, five armed Palestinians attempted to cross into Israel via the beach at Kibbutz Zikim. They were killed by IDF gunfire.

Economy
The main crops are mango and avocado. Zikim also operates one of Israel's largest dairy farms. The main industrial product is polyurethane, produced by the kibbutz factory, Polyrit.

Notable people

 Bob Hoskins
 Peretz Kidron
 Hagai Zamir

References

External links

Official website 

Kibbutzim
Kibbutz Movement
Gaza envelope
Populated places in Southern District (Israel)
Romanian-Jewish culture in Israel
Populated places established in 1949
1949 establishments in Israel